The Flag of Bougainville (Tok Pisin: plak bilong Bogenvil) is a symbol of the Autonomous Region of Bougainville in Papua New Guinea. It was originally adopted in 1975 by the secessionist Republic of the North Solomons.

Design and symbolism

According to the Bougainville Flag, Emblem and Anthem (Protection) Act 2018, the flag consists of "a depiction of an upe superimposed over concentric discs of black and white on a cobalt blue field". The upe is a traditional headdress worn by Bougainvillean men as a symbol of adulthood. The black disc "represents the distinctive skin colour of the Bougainvillean people", while the white disc represents the kapkap, a traditional symbol of authority made from mother of pearl. The 24 green equilateral triangles within the kapkap symbolise "the importance of land to the Bougainvillean people", the blue field represents the ocean. The official flag aspect ratio is 2:3.

History
The flag was designed by Johnathan and Moses Havini. It was first raised at Arawa on 1 September 1975, during the independence celebrations for the unrecognised Republic of North Solomons. It was chosen in a nationwide competition held over many months in 1975. The selection panel appointed by the Bougainville Provincial Assembly included Fr. John Momis M.H.A, Regional Member for Bougainville (PNG Parliament), Mr. Peter Sissiou, President of the Arawa Town Council and Mr. Leo Hannett, Planner, Bougainville Provincial Government.

As a symbol of secession, the flag was initially proscribed by the PNG government. In January 1976, a primary school on Buka Island was shut down for flying the flag. However, the flag was retained by the North Solomons Province following the reintegration of the republic into PNG in 1976. The Provincial Symbols Act 1978 gave official status to the flag and made it an offence to use it for a commercial purpose without the consent of the responsible minister. Later, the Autonomous Bougainville Government's Bougainville Flag, Emblem and Anthem (Protection) Act 2018 reaffirmed the official status of the flag. It also created a new offence of using, displaying, destroying or damaging the flag with the intention of dishonouring it, with a maximum fine of 10,000 kina, and extended the fine for unauthorised commercial use to a maximum of 100,000 kina for corporations.

See also
Flag of Papua New Guinea
List of Papua New Guinean flags

References

Flags of Oceania
Bougainville